Bridge of Souls is the third book in The Quickening series written by Fiona McIntosh.

Plot summary

Wyl Thirsk, former general of the Morgravian army and bearer of the curse known as Myrren's gift, is running out of time. Marriage between his beloved Queen Valentyna and his sworn enemy, the despotic King Celimus, is imminent; yet, despite the impending nuptials, war looms between the two nations, while the threat from the Mountain Kingdom grows stronger. Trapped in a body not his own, with his friends and supporters scattered throughout the realm, Wyl is as desperate to prevent the wedding as he is to end Myrren's "gift"—a magic that will cease only when he assumes the throne of Morgravia.

Clinging to an ominous suggestion from his young friend Fynch, an increasingly powerful mage, Wyl must walk his most dangerous path yet—straight into the brutal clutches of Celimus in a desperate attempt to save his nation, his love, and himself.

References

2004 Australian novels
Australian fantasy novels
Novels by Fiona McIntosh
Voyager Books books